This is a list of lead vocalists. This list includes notable musicians whose status as the lead singer and/or vocalist of a musical group has been established by obvious fact or by the musical group itself. This list does not include persons who frequently share lead vocal duties with other members of a given music group (e.g. John Lennon of the Beatles) or who are principally the public face or spokesperson of the music group (e.g. Pete Wentz of Fall Out Boy). The musician's name appears behind a bullet, and the corresponding musical group appears in parentheses.

0–9

2-D (Gorillaz)

A

B

C

D

E

F

G

H

I

J

K

L

M

N

O

P

R

S

T

U

V

W

Y

Z

Related lists
List of female rock singers

References

Citations

Works cited

Lists of singers